Villers-Faucon is a commune in the Somme department in Hauts-de-France in northern France.

Geography
The commune is situated 15 miles (24 km) northwest of Saint-Quentin, at the D72 and D101 crossroads, in the far east of the département. The commune also includes the hamlet of Sainte-Emilie.

Population

History
According to Abbot Decagny of Roisel, Villers-Faucon was originally Villers-Falcon and previously Villare Falconis, which means, in Latin, villa of the hawks. Villers-Faucon's original purpose was that of a falconry, located in the heart of the forest of Arrouaise. 
The village was almost totally destroyed in 1916, during the First World War. Following a withdrawal of German troops around the Hindenburg line, the inhabitants were evacuated to the north to Denain, tons of dynamite were set off around all of the buildings in the town (including the sugar refinery at St. Emilie) and all the trees were cut down, to leave the field open for the approach of troops. The village was destroyed, but the cemetery was left untouched. 
After the conflict, reconstruction began, which lasted almost a decade, led by a rebuilding cooperative led by Louis Faille.

Sites and monuments
 Notre Dame church was rebuilt in 1932 by architect Louis Faille. It's one of many public buildings completed by the architect in his work during the period of reconstruction of the eastern part of the Somme.

Notable resident
Villers-Faucon is the birthplace of:
 Hélène Nautré (1904-1976),  French resistance fighter and politician.

See also
Communes of the Somme department

References

External links

 Official website of the Communauté de communes de la Haute Somme 

Communes of Somme (department)